

John Fowler Trow (30 January 1810, in Andover, Massachusetts – 8 August 1886, in Orange, New Jersey) was a printer and publisher in New York City.

Life 
Born in Andover, Massachusetts, he moved to New York in 1833. He began publishing city directories in 1848. His business eventually became "John F. Trow & Son," the son being John Fowler Trow Jr. (1850–1912). The publisher then became "John F. Trow & Co." Employees included Peter C. Baker. After Trow's death in 1886, Trow's Directory continued annually for some years.

Trow's Directory
 
 
 1859 ed.
 1865 ed.
 1872 ed.

Family (descendants) 
John F. Trow was the grandfather of organist Ernest Trow Carter (1866–1953). He was a great-great grandfather of American essayist, novelist, playwright, and media critic George William Swift Trow Jr. (1943–2006).

References

Further reading
 New York City Directories

External links
 
 WorldCat. Trow, John Fowler 1810-1886
 Hathi Trust. Trow's Directory of New York City, various dates
 Open Library. Trow's Directory of New York City, various dates

1810 births
1886 deaths
People from Andover, Massachusetts
American publishers (people)
19th-century American businesspeople